Artivion, Inc. is a distributor of cryogenically preserved human tissues for cardiac and vascular transplant applications and develops medical devices. Among its products are human heart valves, which are treated to remove excess cellular material and antigens, and BioGlue surgical adhesive.

Artivion, Inc. incorporated in 1984 in Florida, was the first biomedical company to specialize in the ultra-low temperature preservation of human heart valves used for cardiac reconstruction, primarily in children born with heart defects. The Company preserves and distributes human tissues and develops, manufactures, and commercializes medical devices for cardiac and vascular transplant applications. The human tissues distributed by Artivion include the CryoValve SG pulmonary human heart valve and the CryoPatch SG pulmonary cardiac patch tissue, both processed using Artivion's proprietary SynerGraft technology. Artivion's medical devices consist of surgical adhesives, sealants, and hemostats including BioGlue Surgical Adhesive, PerClot, which the company began distributing for Starch Medical, Inc. in October 2010, as well as On-X Heart Valves, which they acquired in 2016, and aortic stent grafts manufactured by JOTEC GmbH, which they acquired in 2017. In 2019, Artivion entered a distribution agreement with Endospan.The agreement gives Artivion exclusive European distribution rights to Nexus, an endovascular stent graft system approved for the repair of aneurysms and dissections in the aortic arch.

The company preserves small diameter human saphenous vein conduits (3mm to 6mm) for use in peripheral vascular reconstructions and coronary bypass surgery. Failure to achieve revascularization of an obstructed vessel may result in the loss of a limb or even death of the patient. When patients require bypass surgery, the surgeon's first choice
generally is the patient's own vein tissue. However, in cases of advanced vascular disease, 30% of patients have unsuitable vein tissue for transplantation, and the surgeon must consider using synthetic grafts or preserved human vascular tissue. Small diameter synthetic vascular grafts are generally not optimal for below-the-knee surgeries because they have a tendency to obstruct over time. Preserved human vascular tissues tend to remain open longer and as such are used in indications where synthetics typically fail. In addition, synthetic grafts are not suitable for use in infected areas since they may harbor bacteria and are difficult to treat with antibiotics. Preserved human vascular tissues are ideal grafts for patients with previously infected graft sites. The company also preserves femoral veins and arteries and aortoiliac arteries for bypass or reconstruction within infected surgical areas.

In December 2017, Artivion acquired JOTEC AG, A German-based company developer of medical devices for aortic and peripheral vascular diseases, for $225 million.

See also
Allotransplantation
Artificial heart valve

References

https://investors.artivion.com/news-releases/news-release-details/artivion-reports-fourth-quarter-and-full-year-2021-financial

External links
 http://www.caringtoshare.org
 http://www.ctsnet.org
 https://web.archive.org/web/20161009124326/http://therosscommunity.org/
 http://www.jvascsurg.org

Health care companies based in Georgia (US State)
Companies listed on the New York Stock Exchange